Bypass surgery refers to a class of surgery involving  rerouting a tubular body part.

Types include:
 Vascular bypass surgery such as coronary artery bypass surgery, a heart operation
 Cardiopulmonary bypass, a technique used in coronary artery bypass surgery
 Weight loss or Bariatric surgery:
 Vertical banded gastroplasty surgery or "stomach stapling", the upper part of the stomach is permanently stapled to create a smaller pouch
 Adjustable gastric band or "lap band", a band creates a pocket in the stomach that can be adjusted with a port placed just under the skin
 Roux-en-Y gastric bypass surgery, the small intestine is connected to the upper part of the stomach
 Partial ileal bypass surgery, shortening the final portion of the small intestine
 Popliteal bypass surgery, to treat diseased leg arteries above or below the knee
 Jejunojejunostomy, surgery that connects two portions of small intestine and is no longer used
 Ileojejunal bypass, surgery that connects the middle and final portions of the small intestine that was experimental and is no longer used.

References

Surgical procedures and techniques